Eupithecia semigraphata is a moth in the family Geometridae. It is found from most of Europe (except the Netherlands, Ireland, Great Britain, Denmark, Fennoscandia, the Baltic region and Portugal) to the Caucasus and Armenia. It is also present on the Canary Islands and North Africa.

The wingspan is about 18–20 mm. Adults are on wing from late June to August in one generation per year.

The larvae feed on the flowers of Calamintha (including Calamintha nepeta and Calamintha sylvatica), Hypericum, Origanum and Thymus species. The species overwinters in the pupal stage.

Subspecies
Eupithecia semigraphata semigraphata
Eupithecia semigraphata arida Dietze, 1910
Eupithecia semigraphata canariensis Dietze, 1910
Eupithecia semigraphata gravosata Schutze, 1956
Eupithecia semigraphata lutulentaria Schwingenschuss, 1939
Eupithecia semigraphata nepetata Mabille, 1869
Eupithecia semigraphata porphyrata Zerny, 1934

References

Moths described in 1850
semigraphata
Moths of Europe
Moths of Africa
Moths of Asia